Morton Wayne Thiebaud (November 15, 1920 – December 25, 2021) was an American painter known for his colorful works depicting commonplace objects—pies, lipsticks, paint cans, ice cream cones, pastries, and hot dogs—as well as for his landscapes and figure paintings. Thiebaud is associated with the pop art movement because of his interest in objects of mass culture, although his early works, executed during the fifties and sixties, slightly predate the works of the classic pop artists. Thiebaud used heavy pigment and exaggerated colors to depict his subjects, and the well-defined shadows characteristic of advertisements are almost always included in his work.

Early life and education 
Thiebaud was born to Alice Eugenia (Le Baron) and Morton Thiebaud in Mesa, Arizona. They moved a year later to Southern California where the family lived for most of Thiebaud's childhood until he graduated from secondary school in Long Beach, California. Thiebaud and his family were members of the Church of Jesus Christ of Latter-day Saints, and his father was a bishop in the church when Thiebaud was a teenager. Morton was also a Ford mechanic, foreman at Gold Medal Creamery, traffic safety supervisor, and real estate agent.

One summer during his high school years, he apprenticed at Walt Disney Studios  The next summer, he studied at the Frank Wiggins Trade School in Los Angeles. From 1938 to 1949, he worked as a cartoonist and designer in California and New York City. He served as an artist in the First Motion Picture Unit of the United States Army Air Forces from 1942 to 1945.

In 1949, he enrolled at San Jose State College (now San José State University) before transferring to Sacramento State College (now California State University, Sacramento), where he earned a bachelor's degree in 1951 and a master's degree in 1952.

Career 
Thiebaud subsequently began teaching at Sacramento City College. In 1960, he became assistant professor at the University of California, Davis, where he remained through 1991 and influenced numerous art students. He held a Professor Emeritus title there up until his death in late 2021. Occasionally, he gave pro bono lectures at U.C. Davis.

On a leave of absence during 1956–57,  he spent time in New York City, where he became friends with Elaine and Willem de Kooning and Franz Kline, and was much influenced by these abstractionists as well as by proto-pop artists Robert Rauschenberg and Jasper Johns. During this time, he began a series of very small paintings based on images of food displayed in windows, and he focused on their basic shapes.

Returning to California, he pursued this subject matter and style, isolating triangles, circles, squares, etc. He also co-founded the Artists Cooperative Gallery, now Artists Contemporary Gallery, and other cooperatives including Pond Farm, having been exposed to the concept of cooperatives in New York.

In 1960, he had his first solo show in San Francisco at the San Francisco Museum of Modern Art, and shows in New York City at the Staempfli and Tanager galleries. These shows received little notice, but two years later, a 1962 Sidney Janis Gallery exhibition in New York officially launched Pop Art, bringing Thiebaud national recognition, although he disclaimed being anything other than a painter of illusionistic form.

In 1961, Thiebaud met and became friends with art dealer Allan Stone (1932–2006), the man who gave him his first "break." Stone was Thiebaud's dealer until Stone's death in 2006. Stone said of Thiebaud "I have had the pleasure of friendship with a complex and talented man, a terrific teacher and cook, the best raconteur in the west with a spin serve, and a great painter whose magical touch is exceeded only by his genuine modesty and humility.  Thiebaud's dedication to painting and his pursuit of excellence inspire all who are lucky enough to come in contact with him. He is a very special man."  After Stone's death, Thiebaud's son Paul Thiebaud (1960–2010) took over as his dealer. Paul Thiebaud was a successful art dealer in his own right and had eponymous galleries in Manhattan and San Francisco; he died June 19, 2010.

In 1962, Thiebaud's work was included, along with Roy Lichtenstein, Andy Warhol, Jim Dine, Phillip Hefferton, Joe Goode, Edward Ruscha, and Robert Dowd, in the historically important and ground-breaking "New Painting of Common Objects," curated by Walter Hopps at the Pasadena Art Museum (now the Norton Simon Museum at Pasadena). This exhibition is considered to have been one of the first Pop Art exhibitions in the United States. These painters were part of a new movement, in a time of social unrest, which shocked the United States and the art world.

In 1963, he turned increasingly to figure painting: wooden and rigid, with each detail sharply emphasized. In 1964, he made his first prints at Crown Point Press, and continued to make prints throughout his career. In 1967, his work was shown at the Biennale Internationale.

Personal life and death 
Thiebaud was married twice. With his first wife, Patricia Patterson, he had two children, one of whom is the model and writer Twinka Thiebaud. With his second wife, Betty Jean Carr, he had a son, Paul LeBaron Thiebaud, who became an art dealer. He also adopted Betty's son, Matthew.

He died at his residence in Sacramento on Christmas Day 2021, at the age of 101.

Work 

Thiebaud is well known for his paintings of production line objects found in diners and cafeterias, such as pies and pastries. As a young man in Long Beach, he worked at a cafe named Mile High and Red Hot, where "Mile High" was ice cream and "Red Hot" was a hot dog.

He was associated with the Pop art painters because of his interest in objects of mass culture; however, his works, executed during the 1950s and 1960s, slightly predate the works of the classic pop artists, suggesting that Thiebaud may have had an influence on the movement. Thiebaud employed heavy pigment and exaggerated colors to depict his subjects, and the well-defined shadows characteristic of advertisements are almost always included in his work. Thiebaud was averse to labels such as "fine art" versus "commercial art" and described himself as "just an old-fashioned painter". He disliked Andy Warhol's "flat" and "mechanical" paintings and did not consider himself a pop artist.

In addition to pastries, Thiebaud  painted characters such as Mickey Mouse as well as landscapes, streetscapes, and cityscapes, which were influenced by the work of Richard Diebenkorn. His paintings such as Sunset Streets (1985) and Flatland River (1997) are noted for their hyper realism, and have been compared to Edward Hopper's work, another artist who was fascinated with mundane scenes from everyday American life.

Notable works 

1961    Drink Syrups
1961    Pies, Pies, Pies
1962    Around the Cake
1962    Bakery Counter
1962    Confections
1962    Candy Machine
1963    Display Cakes
1963    Cakes
1963    Girl with Ice Cream Cone
1964    Three Strawberry Shakes
1964    Eight Lipsticks
1964    Man Sitting – Back View
1964    Lemon Cake
1966    Powder With Puff
1968    Coloma Ridge
1968    Sandwich
1970    Seven Suckers
1971    Four Cupcakes
1975    Shoe Rows
1976    Potrero Hill
1977    24th Street Intersection
1981    Hill Street (Day City)
1987    Two Paint Cans
1991    The Three Cows
1992    Thirteen Books
1993    Apartment View
1993    Coastline (California Arts Council specialty license plate)
1996    Farm Channel
1999    Reservoir
2000    Clown Cones
2002    Jolly Cones (Ice Cream Cones)
2008    Three Ice cream Cones
2010    The Google 12th Birthday Cake
2010    Tulip Sundae

Collections and exhibitions 
Thiebaud's works are in permanent collections at the Los Angeles County Museum of Art, the Crocker Art Museum, and the Whitney Museum of American Art. The Hirshhorn Museum and Sculpture Garden, the Albright-Knox Art Gallery, the San Francisco Museum of Modern Art, and the Phoenix Art Museum have also held works by the artist. Exhibitions featuring Thiebaud include a 2001 retrospective at the Whitney Museum, a 2012 retrospective at Acquavella Galleries, and a 2021 retrospective at the Toledo Museum of Art.

The Crocker has hosted a Thiebaud exhibition every decade since 1951, including "Wayne Thiebaud 100" to honor the artist's 100th birthday in 2020.

Recognition 
In 1987, Thiebaud was awarded the Golden Plate Award of the American Academy of Achievement. On October 14, 1994, Thiebaud was presented with the National Medal of Arts by President Clinton. In 2009, he was honored by California Lawyers for the Arts with its Artistic License Award at its annual gala celebration. He also received the Lifetime Achievement Award for Art from the American Academy of Design in 2001. Thiebaud was inducted into the California Hall of Fame in 2010 at the California Museum, Sacramento, and in 2013, he was honored with the California Art Award in recognition of his part in raising the prominence of California art around the world.

Auction records 
In November 2019, Sotheby's $8.46 million sale of Thiebaud's 2011 painting Encased Cakes set an auction record for the artist. This record was broken in July 2020, when his 1962 painting Four Pinball Machines sold for $19,135,000 in New York City at a Christie's global live auction event.

Influences 
One of Thiebaud's students from Sacramento City College was the artist Fritz Scholder (1937–2005), who went on to become a major influence in the direction of American Indian art through his instruction at the Institute of American Indian Arts in Santa Fe, New Mexico (1964–1969). The painter Mel Ramos (1935–2018), considered Thiebaud his mentor.  Among his pupils were the painters Faith Bromberg, Vonn Cummings Sumner, and Christopher Brown.

Sharon Core is a photographer known for her photographic interpretations of Thiebaud's works.

References

Books 
 Nash, Steven A.; Wayne Thiebaud Paintings: A Retrospective (Thames Hudson, 2000) 
 Baker, Kenneth; Fox Weber, Nicholas; Wayne Thiebaud (Rizzoli, 2022) 
 Rubin, Susan; Life and Art of Wayne Thiebaud (Chronicle Press, 2008) 
 Shields, Scott; Wayne Thiebaud 100: Paintings, Prints, and Drawings (Pomegranate, 2020) 
 Thiebaud, Wayne; Williams, LG; Cooper, Gene; Wayne Thiebaud Lectures on Art and Drawing (PCP Press, 2018)

Further reading 
 John Coplans, "New Paintings of Common Objects", Artforum, November 1962. (Illustrations)

External links 

Wayne Thiebaud at the National Gallery of Art
Wayne Thiebaud papers, Archives of American Art, Smithsonian Institution
 Interview with Wayne Thiebaud, May 17-18, 2001, Archives of American Art, Smithsonian Institution
Wayne Thiebaud in the National Gallery of Australia's Kenneth Tyler Collection
 Seeing America video discussion of Wayne Thiebaud's Ponds and Streams (2001) featuring Fine Arts Museums of San Francisco curator Dr. Lauren Palmor and Dr. Stephen Zucker of Smarthistory YouTube channel
 Wayne Thiebaud Biography and Interview with American Academy of Achievement
 Wayne Thiebaud, Playful Painter of the Everyday, Dies at 101

1920 births
2021 deaths
Painters from Arizona
Painters from California
San Jose State University alumni
California State University, Sacramento alumni
Members of the American Academy of Arts and Letters
United States National Medal of Arts recipients
People from Long Beach, California
People from Mesa, Arizona
American pop artists
American still life painters
University of California, Davis faculty
American Latter Day Saints
First Motion Picture Unit personnel
20th-century American painters
American male painters
American centenarians
21st-century American painters
21st-century American male artists
20th-century American printmakers
United States Army Air Forces soldiers
Men centenarians
20th-century American male artists